Martin L. Laub (born February 26, 1944) is a former Republican member of the Pennsylvania House of Representatives.
 He is a native of Philadelphia.

Pennsylvania House of Representatives 
Laub served in the Pennsylvania House of Representatives from January 5, 1993 until he was released from duty in November 30, 1994.

References

Republican Party members of the Pennsylvania House of Representatives
Living people
1944 births